Victory Park is a park in Riga, located on the left bank of the Daugava, in the district of Āgenskalns.The modern area of the park is 36.7 hectares.

History
When Latvia was in the Russian Empire, the park was known as Riga Petrovsky Park. It was created in 1909 on the eve of a large-scale celebration of the bicentennial anniversary of the actual accession of the Governorate of Livonia to the Russian Empire. The official opening ceremony of the park complex took place in the middle of 1910 in the presence of Tsar Nicholas II, and the Mayor of Riga George Armitstead.

In 1923, the park was renamed  Victory Park in honor of the victory in 1919 over the West Russian Volunteer Army under the command of Colonel Pavel Bermondt-Avalov during the Latvian War of Independence.

Before the Second World War, a reconstruction of the park was carried out, aimed at creating a new socially significant leisure center for the population of the Latvian capital. During the Soviet occupation, the Riga City Council decided to rename the park after the 1961 22nd Congress of the Communist Party of the Soviet Union. In 1985, the Monument to the Liberators of Soviet Latvia and Riga from the German Fascist Invaders was opened, and at this point, the Riga City Council renamed the park to Victory Park again.

Following the 2022 Russian invasion of Ukraine, the monument was removed on 22–25 August.

References

Parks in Latvia